Ab Garm (also Romanized as Āb Garm, Āb-e Garm, Ābgarm, and Āb-i-Garm) is a village in Gazik Rural District, Gazik District, Darmian County, South Khorasan Province, Iran. At the 2006 census, its population was 284, in 62 families.

References 

Populated places in Darmian County